Borovský may refer to:

 Karel Havlíček Borovský (1821, Borová (today Havlíčkova Borová) – 1856, Prague)
 Karel Havlíček Borovský (film), a 1925 Czechoslovak biographical film drama
 2706 Borovský, a main belt asteroid

See also 
 Borovský potok, several rivers in Slovakia and Czech Republic
 Bôrovský potok (Slovak variant)

Czech-language surnames
Slovak-language surnames